Emory Sherwood Adams (February 6, 1881 – November 30, 1967) was an officer in the United States Army who served as Adjutant General from 1938 to 1942.

Early life
Adams was born in Manhattan, Kansas on February 6, 1881.  He graduated from Kansas State Agricultural College in 1898.

Military career
Adams served with the 20th Kansas Infantry and Regular Army from 1898 to 1902.  He was commissioned as an infantry officer in October 1902.  He saw overseas duty in the Philippines, China, and France.  He had extended duty with the adjutant general department from 1922 to 1938.  This service was followed by an appointment to Adjutant General with a rank of Major General in May 1938.  He retired from service on February 28, 1942, but was recalled the next month.  He continued to serve until August 1945.  His decorations included the Distinguished Service Medal for service in Brest, France during World War I.

Later life
Adams died on November 30, 1967.

See also

 List of Adjutants General of the U.S. Army

References

External links

Generals of World War II

1881 births
1967 deaths
Adjutants general of the United States Army
United States Army personnel of World War I
Kansas State University alumni
People of the Spanish–American War
United States Army generals
People from Manhattan, Kansas
United States Army generals of World War II